Group A of the 2019 FIBA Basketball World Cup was the group stage of the 2019 FIBA Basketball World Cup for the , ,  and . Each team played each other once, for a total of three games per team, with all games played at Wukesong Arena, Beijing. After all of the games were played, the top two teams with the best records qualified for the Second round and the bottom two teams played in the Classification Round.

Teams

Standings

Games
All times are local (UTC+8).

Poland vs. Venezuela
This was the first competitive game between Poland and Venezuela.

Ivory Coast vs. China
This was the fourth meeting between the Ivory Coast and China in the World Cup. The Chinese have won all three prior meetings, including their 2010 match-up, which was the most recent game.

Venezuela vs. Ivory Coast
This was the first competitive game between Venezuela and the Ivory Coast.

China vs. Poland
This was the first competitive game between China and Poland.

Ivory Coast vs. Poland
This was the first competitive game between the Ivory Coast and Poland.

Venezuela vs. China
This was the second meeting between Venezuela and China in the World Cup. The Venezuelans won their first meeting in 1990. The Venezuelans also won their last competitive game against the Chinese, in the 2016 Olympics.

References

External links

2019 FIBA Basketball World Cup
2018–19 in Chinese basketball
2018–19 in Polish basketball